Dalophis is a genus of eels in the snake eel family Ophichthidae. It currently contains the following species:

 Dalophis boulengeri (Blache, Cadenat & Stauch, 1970)
 Dalophis cephalopeltis (Bleeker, 1863)
 Dalophis imberbis (Delaroche, 1809) (Armless snake-eel)
 Dalophis multidentatus Blache & Bauchot, 1972
 Dalophis obtusirostris Blache & Bauchot, 1972

References

 

Ophichthidae
Taxa named by Constantine Samuel Rafinesque